David Handley may refer to:
 David Handley (cyclist)
 David Handley (farmer)